Amphiesmoides is a genus of snake in the family Colubridae  that contains the sole species Amphiesmoides ornaticeps. It is commonly known as Werner's ornate snake or white-eyed keelback.

It is found in China and Vietnam.

References 

Natricinae
Monotypic snake genera